Sarojini Naidu College for Women, established in 1956, is a women's college in Dum Dum, Kolkata. It offers undergraduate courses in arts and sciences and postgraduate courses in Bengali and English. It is affiliated to West Bengal State University. The name commemorates the legacy of freedom fighter and poet Sarojini Naidu.

Departments

Science
Geography
Chemistry
Physics
Mathematics
Botany
Zoology
Anthropology
Molecular Biology
Psychology
Food and Nutrition
Environmental Science
Computer Application

Arts&Commerce
Bengali
English
Sanskrit
History
Political Science
Philosophy
Economics
Psychology
Sociology
Hindi
Education
Physical Education
Commerce

Accreditation
Sarojini Naidu College for Women is recognized by the University Grants Commission (UGC). It was accredited by the National Assessment and Accreditation Council (NAAC) and awarded B grade with 2.89 CGPA (2nd Cycle, dated  16.01.2016 at E.C. of NAAC).

See also
Education in India
List of colleges in West Bengal
Education in West Bengal

References

External links
Sarojini Naidu College for Women

Educational institutions established in 1956
Colleges affiliated to West Bengal State University
Women's universities and colleges in West Bengal
1956 establishments in West Bengal